Mad Secret Concerts: Helena Paparizou is the second DVD video release by Greek pop singer, Helena Paparizou. It was recorded on December 13, 2005 as part of the television specials MAD Secret Concerts by MAD TV at the Iera Odos club, in Athens, Greece, and released on July 22, 2006 in Greece and Cyprus by Sony BMG Greece.

The first radio single released from the album was "Just Walk Away", which received a lot of radio success. The video premiered on May 20 on MAD TV.

DVD features
"Smooth Operator" (Sade)
"Crazy" (Seal)
"Outside" (George Michael)
"Suddenly" (Billy Ocean)
"Sweet Dreams (Are Made of This)" (Eurythmics)
"Just Walk Away" (Celine Dion)
"You Set My Heart on Fire" (Tina Charles)
"Can't Help Falling In Love" (Elvis Presley)
"The Light in Our Soul"
"Why" (Antique)
"That's the Way It Is" (Celine Dion)
"Don't Speak" (No Doubt)
"Like A Prayer" (Madonna)
"Imagine" (John Lennon)

Release history

Charts

References

Helena Paparizou video albums
MAD Secret Concerts
2006 live albums
2006 video albums
Live video albums
Sony Music Greece video albums
Sony Music Greece live albums